James Charles Burnett (1815—1854) a.k.a. "John" was a surveyor and explorer in New South Wales (including Queensland), Australia. He was the head of the first Survey Office established at Brisbane in 1844.

Note, the separation of Queensland from New South Wales did not occur until 1859 and so the name Queensland was not used in Burnett's lifetime.

Early life
James Charles Burnett was born in North Britain (possibly Scotland), the son of William Burnett. He emigrated as a young child with his family to New South Wales where his father established Burnettland near Raymond Terrace in the Hunter River district.

Surveying career
In 1834 he entered the service of the Survey department of New South Wales, spending a considerable period in the Illawarra district. Burnett was selected by Sir Thomas Mitchell to lead a survey to trace the Great Dividing Range from south of Hanging Rock northward towards Moreton Bay. Burnett set off in October 1841 with Roderick Mitchell (son of Thomas Mitchell) as second-in-command of the party. After many difficulties, the range was traced to about the 30°S and then the party headed for Brisbane arriving September 1842.

In 1845, he was appointed a Commissioner of Crown Lands.

Burnett subsequently undertook surveys of the Clarence River and Richmond River. In 1846, he was appointed in charge of the surveys in Moreton Bay and settled in Brisbane. In 1846 to 1847 he explored north of Moreton Bay in the area of the Mary River and Burnett River. His efforts in exploring Queensland (as it is now known) were recognised by New South Wales Governor Charles Augustus FitzRoy by naming the Burnett River and the surrounding area after Burnett.

Later life

Burnett died on 18 July 1854 aged 39 years at his home in Brisbane. For several months prior to his death, he had poor health, which was attributed to his "enthusiastic and almost reckless devotion to the trying duties of his profession". He had not left his home for several weeks prior to his death. He was buried in the Church of England section of the North Brisbane burial ground (now underneath the Lang Park stadium).

Legacy
A few days before Burnett's death, he received word that he had been elected a Fellow of the Royal Geographical Society.

At the time of his death, it was proposed that a public subscription be established to create a lasting memorial to him, but this did not occur. However, in 1988, the Institution of Surveyors Australia erected a plaque honouring Burnett on the Wide Bay Highway, Ban Ban Springs through which Burnett had passed in March 1847 while exploring the Burnett River district. Also, visual artist Natalie Billing used the rear of a building in Burnett Lane in Brisbane to create a tribute to Burnett (after whom the lane is named).

Named in his honour
Places names after Burnett include:
 New South Wales
 Burnett County, New South Wales
 Queensland
 Burnett Lane, Brisbane
 Burnett River, which he discovered in 1847
 Mount Burnett

References

External links
  – Discovery of the Burnett River

Australian surveyors
1815 births
1854 deaths
British emigrants to Australia
Pre-Separation Queensland